Xavier Lemaître is a French actor.

Career 
Lemaître obtained a degree from KEDGE Business School and began the Cartier's director and met Jean-Claude Brialy who thought that he should play on stage. In 2005, he decided to study acting.

In 2008 he started to work with Richard Berry, Jean Reno and Omar Sy.

He lives with the Romanian model Diana Dondoe.

Filmography

Film 
 2010 :  22 Bullets de Richard Berry 
 2012 : Il était une fois, une fois
 2012 : On the Other Side of the Tracks 
 2013 : It Boy 
 2013 : Me, Myself and Mum
 2014 : 3 Days to Kill
 2015 : The Squad 
 2015 : Alaska
 2017 : Marie-Francine

Television 
 2008 : Section de recherches
 2008 : Pas de secrets entre nous
 2009 : SoeurThérèse.com
 2009 : Chante !
 2010 : Spiral, season 3 
 2011 : Les Beaux Mecs
 2012 :  Toussaint Louverture
 2013 : R.I.S, police scientifique
 2013 : Ce monde est fou
 2013 : Sous le soleil de Saint-Tropez
 2013 : La Rupture
 2014 : Falco
 2014 : La vallée des mensonges
 2014 : Camping paradis
 2015 : Mr Selfridge, season 3 
 2015 : Le juge est une femme
 2016 : Lanester
 2016 : Meurtres à Dunkerque
 2016 : Mongeville
 2018 : Un adultère
 2018 : Crimes Parfaits
 2018 : Commissaire Magellan
 2021 :  Lupin

Theatre 
 2006 : Le Bourgeois Gentilhomme by Molière
 2006 : A Midsummer Night's Dream by Shakespeare
 2007 : Andromaque by Racine
 2007 : Aux Larmes Citoyens by Raymond Aquaviva 
 2008 : Tartuffe by Molière
 2008 : Danton's Death by Georg Büchner
 2009 : La Sœur du Grec by Eric Delcourt
 2010 -2011 : Hors piste by Eric Delcourt

Award 
 Festival des créations télévisuelles de Luchon 2018 : Best actor in Un adultère.

References

External links 
 
 Official site

Living people
French male film actors
French male television actors
French male stage actors
Year of birth missing (living people)